Annabel Luxford (born 2 March 1982) is an Australian triathlete. In International Triathlon Union (ITU) competition she is the 2005 ITU Triathlon World Cup series champion and the silver medalist at the 2005 ITU Triathlon World Championships. In 2004, she was the ITU under-23 World Champion and also finished second in the ITU Triathlon World Cup standings. In 2013, after changing to non-drafing long course racing, she finished third at the Ironman 70.3 World Championships.

Career
Luxford was born in Sydney, Australia and grew up in Hobart and Brisbane. At the age of ten she competed at the national Cross Country Championships, finishing first in the 2000m event. In high school, she achieved podium finishes at national cross country and middle-distance events and would later win the under-20 Australian Cross Country Championships. At age nine she competed in her first triathlon and continued to compete in school triathlon events throughout high school.

ITU competition
At seventeen she was invited to join the Australian team and competed in the 1999 Junior Elite ITU World Championships in Montreal Canada, finishing fourth. In 2000, she attended Bond University on a sports' scholarship where she studied to earn her degree in communication. Despite her training being limited by her studies whilst at university she was selected in the Australian junior elite or under-23 team and finished top seven at each year's World Championships race.

2004-2006
In 2004, Luxford began competing on the International Triathlon Union race circuit. That year she would win the under-23 World Championship race in Madeira and finished second overall in the ITU World Cup standings. In 2005, she finished first in the ITU World Cup Series rankings and second at the ITU Elite World Championships in Gamagori. The next year she took fifth at the 2006 Commonwealth Games in Melbourne. From 2004 to 2007 Luxford achieved 16 ITU World Cup podium finishes, including four wins.

2007-2009
In 2007, Luxford was selected to be on Triathlon Australia's short list of athletes to compete in the 2008 Summer Olympics; however, a leg injury in 2008 ended her bid for the Olympic Games. She rebounded in 2009 by winning the Australian National title and taking fifth in the ITU World Championship Series (WCS) Grand Final to finish 10th overall in the final WCS rankings.

During this time Luxford obtained her graduate diploma in Applied Law (alternate dispute resolution) from the University of Queensland.

2010-2011
Returning from injury Luxford missed out on achieving some of her goals in 2010. Following two 21st-place finishes and a 16th-place finish on the WCS race circuit she was forced to withdraw from the Grand Final race due to trouble breathing from her asthma. She would later compete in the USA Elite National Championships, finishing third. Unfortunately, her season ended shortly thereafter due to a displaced rib fracture and a partially collapsed lung suffered during a visit to a chiropractor. In 2011, Luxford found that she had lost interest and the passion for ITU racing claiming that "women’s racing it seems to have frequently become a test of who can run the fastest after soft pedalling for 40 km and having a paddle in the water." She then moved onto Olympic distance non-drafting racing at the Hy-Vee Triathlon. This was her first time on a time trial bike, which was lent to her by Mirinda Carfrae.

Non-drafting competition
2012–present
Fully converted to non-drafting triathlon racing Luxford began competing in Life Time Fitness Triathlon Series (amongst other races), securing numerous podium finishes. She also took second place at the 2012 Escape from Alcatraz Triathlon. She then began branching out to longer distance races, including the Ironman 70.3 race series. In December 2012, in her first half Ironman distance event, she took first place at Ironman 70.3 in Canberra and then she took first place at the Ironman 70.3 Asia-Pacific Championship in Auckland in February 2013. Luxford continued her strong 2013 season with a second-place finish at the Ironman 70.3 European Championship in Wiesbaden and a third place a month later at the 2013 Ironman 70.3 World Championship. The following year, in 2014, against strong, competitive fields she took 2nd place at both the Ironman 70.3 Asia-Pacific Championship and at the Abu Dhabi International Triathlon. She also claimed the Ironman 70.3 Australian Championship title in Mandurah; however, a collision with a car whilst training meant that in her second 70.3 World Championship appearance she was unable to match her finish from the previous year, finishing 11th in Mont-Tremblant. In 2015, Luxford began working part-time in digital communications at the National Australia Bank in Melbourne whilst continuing training and competing. That year she competed in her first Ironman, finishing 6th at Ironman Asia-Pacific Championship in Melbourne and raced as a rookie at the Ironman World Championships in Kona, finishing 12th. She also competed successfully in 70.3 and Challenge Half events, winning Ironman 70.3 events in Western Sydney and Ballarat.

References

External links

Living people
Australian female triathletes
Bond University alumni
University of Queensland alumni
Sportswomen from Queensland
1982 births
Sportspeople from Brisbane